Trigonochlamydidae is a family of air-breathing land slugs, terrestrial gastropod molluscs in the clade Eupulmonata (according to the taxonomy of the Gastropoda by Bouchet & Rocroi, 2005).

Distribution 
The native distribution of Trigonochlamydidae includes Caucasus, Iran and Turkey.

Taxonomy 
Previously, Trigonochlamydidae was placed in the superfamily Trigonochlamydoidea Hesse, 1882, in the subinfraorder Sigmurethra. This was the only family within that superfamily.

The family Trigonochlamydidae is now classified within the limacoid clade, which itself belongs to the clade Stylommatophora, within the clade Eupulmonata (according to the taxonomy of the Gastropoda by Bouchet & Rocroi, 2005).

The following two subfamilies have been recognized in the taxonomy of Bouchet & Rocroi (2005):
 subfamily Trigonochlamydinae Hesse, 1882 - synonyms: Selenochlamydinae I. M. Likharev & Wiktor, 1980
 subfamily Parmacellillinae Hesse, 1926

Genera 
There are nine genera in the family Trigonochlamydidae with a total of 11 species:

Subfamily Trigonochlamydinae

 Boreolestes Schileyko & Kijashko, 1999
 Boreolestes likharevi Schileyko & Kijashko, 1999 - type species
 Boreolestes sylvestris Kijashko in Schileyko & Kijashko, 1999
 Drilolestes Lindholm, 1925 - with only one species Drilolestes retowskii (O. Boettger, 1884)
 Hyrcanolestes Simroth, 1901 - with only one species Hyrcanolestes velitaris (Martens, 1880)
 Khostalestes Suvorov, 2003 - with only one species Khostalestes kochetkovi Suvorov, 2003
 Lesticulus Schileyko, 1988 - with only one species Lesticulus nocturnus Schileyko, 1988
 Trigonochlamys O. Boettger, 1881 - type genus of the family Trigonochlamydidae, with only one species Trigonochlamys imitatrix O. Boettger, 1881
 Troglolestes Ljovushkin & Matiokin, 1965 - with only one species Troglolestes sokolovi Liovushkin & Matiokin, 1965
 Selenochlamys O. Boettger, 1883
 Selenochlamys pallida Boettger, 1883 - type species
 Selenochlamys ysbryda Rowson & Symondson, 2008

Subfamily Parmacellillinae
 Parmacellilla Simroth, 1910 - type genus of the subfamily Parmacellillinae, with only one species Parmacellilla filipowitschi Simroth, 1910

Synonym:
 Pseudomilax O. Boettger, 1881 is a synonym for various genera in Trigonochlamydidae.

Cladogram 
The following cladogram shows the phylogenic relationships of this family with the other families in the limacoid clade:

References

External links